Pseudodaphnella barnardi is a species of sea snail, a marine gastropod mollusk in the family Raphitomidae.

It was assigned to Pseudodaphnella by Chang, 2001

Description
The length of the shell varies between 3 mm and 7 mm.

(Original description) The shell is somewhat fusiformly ovate. It is longitudinally stoutly ribbed every alternate black and white and latticed with fine transverse ridges. The interstices are shallow. The shell contains 8  whorls, slightly rounded. The suture is deepand smooth. The spire is acuminated. The apex is acute, brown and granulated. The outer lip is thickened, white and black behind. The sinus is wide, above thickened and shallow. The siphonal canal is slightly recurved.

Distribution
This marine occurs off the Gulf of Carpentaria to Queensland, Australia; the Philippines

References

 Pease, W.H. 1867. Description of marine gasteropodae inhabiting Polynesia. American Journal of Conchology 3(3): 211–222 pl. 15
 Pilsbry, H.A. 1904. New Japanese marine Mollusca: Gastropoda. Proceedings of the Academy of Natural Sciences, Philadelphia 56: 3-37, pls 1-6
 Hedley, C. 1907. The Mollusca of Mast Head Reef, Capricorn Group, Queensland, part II. Proceedings of the Linnean Society of New South Wales 32: 476–513, pls 16–21 
 Cernohorsky, W.O. 1978. Tropical Pacific marine shells. Sydney : Pacific Publications 352 pp., 68 pls. 
 Maes, V.O. 1967. The littoral marine mollusks of Cocos-Keeling Islands (Indian Ocean). Proceedings of the Academy of Natural Sciences, Philadelphia 119: 93–217
 Powell, A.W.B. 1966. The molluscan families Speightiidae and Turridae, an evaluation of the valid taxa, both Recent and fossil, with list of characteristic species. Bulletin of the Auckland Institute and Museum. Auckland, New Zealand 5: 1–184, pls 1–23
 Liu, J.Y. [Ruiyu] (ed.). (2008). Checklist of marine biota of China seas. China Science Press. 1267 pp.

External links
  Hedley, C. 1922. A revision of the Australian Turridae. Records of the Australian Museum 13(6): 213-359, pls 42-56 
 
  Fedosov A. E. & Puillandre N. (2012) Phylogeny and taxonomy of the Kermia–Pseudodaphnella (Mollusca: Gastropoda: Raphitomidae) genus complex: a remarkable radiation via diversification of larval development. Systematics and Biodiversity 10(4): 447-477

barnardi
Gastropods described in 1876